The Scooter World Championships is the premier scootering championship organised by World Skate, the only organization that regulates scootering with the avail of the IOC. The first event took place in 2019 as part of the World Skate Games in Barcelona. This first event was organised after an agreement with the International Scooter Federation, the most popular organization that regulates scootering, to include their World Championship (which has been held annually since 2012) as part of the World Skate Games. After that, World Skate has moved on and organized their own World Championships in 2021, without the involvement of ISF. The third world championship will take place as part of the 2022 World Skate Games

Venues

Elite Medallists

Men

Park

Street

Women

Park

References

Recurring sporting events established in 2019
Scooter